Mordellistena permira is a species of beetle in the genus Mordellistena of the family Mordellidae. It was described by Franciscolo in 1949.

References

Beetles described in 1949
permira